Jimmy Lee Swaggart (born March 15, 1935) is an American Pentecostal televangelist, gospel music recording artist, pianist, and Christian author.

His television ministry, which began in 1971, and was originally known as the Camp Meeting Hour, has a viewing audience both in the U.S. and internationally. The weekly Jimmy Swaggart Telecast and A Study in the Word programs are broadcast throughout the U.S. and on 78 channels in 104 countries, and over the Internet.

At the height of his popularity in the 1980s, his telecast was transmitted to in excess of 3,000 stations and cable systems each week. His "crusades" enabled him to travel throughout the contiguous United States, Canada, Europe, Africa, and South America.

Swaggart plays the piano and he also sings in a baritone voice. During the 1970s and 1980s, he sold in excess of 17 million LP albums.

In 1980, Swaggart received a Grammy Award nomination for Best Performance for Traditional Gospel.

The Jimmy Swaggart Ministries owns and operates the SonLife Broadcasting Network (SBN). Swaggart is the senior pastor of the Family Worship Center in Baton Rouge, Louisiana.

Early life
Jimmy Lee Swaggart was born on March 15, 1935, in Ferriday, Louisiana, to fiddle player and Pentecostal preacher Willie Leon (known as "Sun" or "Son") Swaggart and Minnie Bell Herron, daughter of sharecropper William Herron. They were related by marriage, as Son's maternal uncle was Elmo Lewis, who was married to Minnie's sister Mamie. The extended family had a complex network of interrelationships: "cousins and in-laws and other relatives married each other until the clan was entwined like a big, tight ball of rubber bands."

He is the cousin of rockabilly pioneer Jerry Lee Lewis and country music star Mickey Gilley. He also had a sister, Jeanette Ensminger (1942–1999). With his parents, Swaggart attended small Assemblies of God churches in Ferriday and Wisner.

In 1952, aged 17, Swaggart married 15-year-old Frances Anderson, whom he met in church in Wisner, Louisiana while he was playing music with his father, who pastored the Assembly of God Church there. They have a son named Donnie. Swaggart worked several part-time odd jobs to support his young family and also began singing Southern Gospel music at various churches.

According to his autobiography To Cross a River, Swaggart, along with his wife and son, lived in poverty during the 1950s as he preached throughout rural Louisiana, struggling to survive on an income of $30 a week. Being too poor to own a home, the Swaggarts lived in church basements, homes of pastors, and small motels. Sun Records producer Sam Phillips wanted to start a gospel line of music for the label (perhaps to remain in competition with RCA Victor and Columbia, who also had gospel lines at the time) and wanted Swaggart for Sun as the first gospel artist for the label.

His cousin Jerry Lee Lewis, who had previously signed with Sun, was reportedly earning $20,000 per week at the time. Although the offer meant a promise for significant income for him and his family, Swaggart turned Phillips down, stating that he was called to preach the gospel.

Ordination and early career
Preaching from a flatbed trailer donated to him, Swaggart began full-time evangelistic work in 1955. He began developing a revival-meeting following throughout the American South.  In 1960, he began recording gospel music record albums and transmitting on Christian radio stations. In 1961, Swaggart was ordained by the Assemblies of God; a year later he began his radio ministry. In the late 1960s, Swaggart founded what was then a small church named the Family Worship Center in Baton Rouge, Louisiana; the church eventually became district-affiliated with the Assemblies of God.

In 1971, Swaggart began transmitting a weekly 30-minute telecast over various local television stations in Baton Rouge and also purchased a local AM radio station, WLUX (now WPFC). The station broadcast Christian feature stories, preaching and teaching to various fundamentalist and Pentecostal denominations and playing black gospel, Southern gospel, and inspirational music. As Contemporary Christian music (CCM) became more prevalent, the station avoided playing it. However, Swaggart did cover Chuck Girard's CCM song "Sometimes Alleluia", using this as the theme to his weekly and flagship namesake program. Swaggart sold many of his radio stations gradually throughout the 1980s and early 1990s. Jimmy Swaggart Ministries still operates several radio stations that operate under the name Sonlife Radio.

Swaggart wrote a book, Religious Rock n Roll: A Wolf in Sheep's Clothing, in 1987.

In his monthly periodical known as "The Evangelist", he wrote against worldliness in worship music, particularly referring to a Carman concert.

He also mentioned in the article that Christian leaders were in "terrible opposition" with him for preaching the truth against contemporary Christian music and its artists.

Swaggart has often preached that God does not borrow from the world to reach the youth, but has since changed his position on contemporary Christian music and has integrated its sound and style in his worship services such as Hillsong.

Shifting to television
By 1975, the television ministry had expanded to more stations around the United States, and he began to use television as his primary preaching forum. In 1978, the weekly telecast was increased to an hour.

In 1980, Swaggart began a daily weekday telecast featuring Bible study and music, and the weekend, hour-long telecast included a service from either Family Worship Center (Swaggart's church) or an on-location crusade in a major city. In the early 1980s, the broadcasts expanded to major cities nationwide. By 1983, more than 250 television stations broadcast the telecast.

Promotion of RENAMO
Throughout the 1980s, Jimmy Swaggart Ministries was one of many American Evangelical leaders who promoted the South African-backed Mozambican National Resistance, aka RENAMO, which was accused of committing systematic war crimes during Mozambique's 15-year-long civil war. In addition to moral support and publicity, Swaggart Ministries was repeatedly accused of providing funding and material support to the group. In September 1985, government forces supported by Zimbabwe captured RENAMO's main HQ inside Mozambique, Casa Banana in Gorongosa district. Among the materials left behind by retreating rebels were piles of Swaggart's 1982 publication, "How to Receive The Baptism in the Holy Spirit" translated into Portuguese. During the 1988 trial of Australian missionary Ian Grey, who coordinated much of the private support to RENAMO, it was claimed by the defendant that Swaggart Ministries worked through ex-Rhodesian soldier Michael T Howard's Shekinah Ministries to provide support to RENAMO. That year, extensive media coverage of Swaggart and his businesses in the wake of a sex scandal largely excluded these allegations. In 1991, Covert Action Magazine and the government of Zimbabwe both accused Swaggart ministries of continuing to fund RENAMO.

Prostitution scandals
In 1988, Swaggart was accused of a sex scandal involving a prostitute, initially resulting in his suspension, and ultimately defrocking, by the Assemblies of God. Three years later Swaggart was implicated in another scandal involving prostitution. As a result, Swaggart's ministry became non-affiliated, nondenominational, and significantly smaller than it was in the ministry's pre-scandal years.

Feud with Marvin Gorman
Swaggart's first exposure was in retaliation for an incident in 1986 when he exposed fellow Assemblies of God minister Marvin Gorman, whom he accused of having several affairs. Once he was exposed, Gorman was defrocked from the Assemblies of God, and his ministry was all but ended. Gorman filed a successful lawsuit against Swaggart for defamation and conspiracy to ruin his reputation which led to the award of damages amounting to $10 million in 1991, reduced after an appeal and an out-of-court settlement to $1.75 million.

However, as a retaliatory measure, Gorman hired his son Randy and son-in-law Garland Bilbo to watch the Travel Inn on Airline Highway in Metairie, a suburb of New Orleans. A camera with a telephoto lens was placed in the window of the motel's Room 12, and draped with a black cloth. When Swaggart arrived, he reportedly went into Room 7. Randy Gorman and Garland Bilbo let the air out of the tires on Swaggart's vehicle. They called Marvin Gorman, whose church was located nearby. Randy Gorman and Garland Bilbo had taken photos of Swaggart outside Room 7 with Debra Murphree, a local prostitute. Gorman arrived at the Travel Inn a short while later and confronted Swaggart, although on details accounts from both sides differed.

According to Swaggart: The Unauthorized Biography of an American Evangelist, by Ann Rowe Seaman, Gorman secured a promise from Swaggart that he would publicly apologize to Gorman and start the process of Gorman's reinstatement to the Assemblies of God.   Gorman offered to remain silent if Swaggart would state publicly that he lied about Gorman's affairs. Gorman waited almost a year, then hand-delivered a note to Swaggart informing him his time was up; Swaggart did not respond. On February 16, 1988, Gorman contacted James Hamil, one of the 13-man Executive Presbytery of the Assemblies of God, who called G. Raymond Carlson, the Assemblies Superintendent. Carlson summoned Hamill and Gorman to fly to Assemblies of God headquarters in Springfield, Missouri, and arranged for an emergency meeting of the presbyters. He was shown photos of several men coming in and going out of Room 7 at the Travel Inn Motel in New Orleans. This was done to establish that the room was being used for prostitution. One of the men shown leaving Room 7 was Swaggart. The presbytery leadership of the Assemblies of God decided that Swaggart should be suspended from broadcasting his television program for three months.

According to the Associated Press, Murphree, who claimed to have posed nude for Swaggart, failed a polygraph test administered by a New York City Police Department polygraph expert. The test administrator concluded that Murphree had failed to tell the truth on all key questions concerning her statement. The test was administered after Murphree offered to sell the story to the National Enquirer for $100,000. Paul Levy, senior editor for the Enquirer, stated that the polygraph examiner had concluded Murphree was not truthful on six key questions, including one in which she was reportedly asked if she had fabricated the story. Levy stated that the Enquirer decided not to print her story due to the test results, her drug use, and the fact that she had arrest warrants in three states. Murphree failed questions about whether she was paid or promised money to "set up" Swaggart, and whether she made up the story to make money from it. In place of Murphree's interview, Enquirer editor Levy published an accounting of Swaggart"s family where they allegedly expressed their fears over Swaggart's health. Murphree, who blamed her failed polygraph on "cocaine use" the day before the test was given, went on to have her interview published by Penthouse magazine.

Swaggart's confession and defrocking 

On February 21, 1988, without giving any details regarding his transgressions, Swaggart delivered what came to be known as his "I have sinned" speech on live television. He spoke tearfully to his family, congregation, TV audience, and ended it with a prayer, "I have sinned against You, my Lord, and I would ask that Your Precious Blood ... would wash and cleanse every stain until it is in the seas of God's forgetfulness never to be remembered against me anymore."

The Louisiana presbytery of the Assemblies of God initially suspended Swaggart from the ministry for three months. The national presbytery of the Assemblies of God soon extended the suspension to their standard two-year suspension for sexual immorality. His return to the pulpit coincided with the end of a three-month suspension originally ordered by the denomination. Believing that Swaggart was not genuinely repentant in submitting to their authority, the hierarchy of the Assemblies of God defrocked him, removing his credentials and ministerial license.

Swaggart then became an independent and non-denominational Pentecostal minister, establishing Jimmy Swaggart Ministries, based at the Family Worship Center in Baton Rouge, Louisiana, and the Sonlife Broadcasting Network (SBN) which can be seen in the United States and other countries.

1991 scandal
On October 11, 1991, Swaggart was found in the company of a prostitute for a second time. He was pulled over by a police officer in Indio, California, for driving on the wrong side of the road. With him in the vehicle was a woman named Rosemary Garcia. According to Garcia, Swaggart had stopped to propose sex to her on the side of the road. She later told reporters: "He asked me for sex. I mean, that's why he stopped me. That's what I do. I'm a prostitute." This time, rather than confessing his sins to his congregation, Swaggart told those at Family Worship Center, "The Lord told me it's flat none of your business." Swaggart's son Donnie then announced to the audience that his father would be temporarily stepping down as head of Jimmy Swaggart Ministries for "a time of healing and counseling".

Ministries

 Jimmy Swaggart Ministries mainly comprised Family Worship Center, The Jimmy Swaggart Telecast, radio and television programs called A Study in the Word, SonLife Radio Network, a website, and a 24/7 cable and satellite television network, SonLife Broadcasting Network (SBN).

Swaggart's wife Frances hosts a television program, Frances and Friends, shown daily on SBN. Swaggart also hosts a daily Bible study program on SBN, The Message of the Cross. His son Donnie preaches at Family Worship Center and also preaches in churches across America and abroad. Donnie's son Gabriel is the ministry's youth pastor who leads Crossfire, Family Worship Center's youth ministry. SBN also delivers live broadcasts of all of its weekly services at Family Worship Center, as well as live broadcasts of all of its camp meetings.

Radio
Swaggart started SonLife Radio on the noncommercial FM band. Unlike his previous stations, SonLife was commercial-free and it did not sell time to outside ministries; the preaching and teaching were all produced in-house. The music which it played was primarily Southern Gospel. SonLife Radio is also streamed on the Internet.
Some controversy arose concerning the ministry raising money for stations that were never built.

List of radio stations
The network's flagship station is WJFM in Baton Rouge, Louisiana.

Notes:

Translators

Television
In 1973, Swaggart proposed to television producers in Nashville, Tennessee a television program including a fairly large music segment, a short sermon, and time for talking about current ministry projects, after two faltering attempts to tape the half-hour program in Baton Rouge and New Orleans. They accepted, and within weeks the Jimmy Swaggart Telecast was being broadcast around the United States.

In 1981, Swaggart launched a daily television program titled A Study in the Word. From the beginning, the primary cable channels which the program was aired on were CBN Cable (now Freeform), TBN, and the old PTL Network (now the Inspiration Network).

In 1988, Swaggart lost some of his broadcast and merchandise rights following his first prostitution scandal. In 1991, Swaggart's career as standard televangelist came to an end after more local TV stations cancelled their contracts with him following a second prostitution scandal.

In 2010, Jimmy Swaggart Ministries launched a 24 hour-a-day television network entitled the Sonlife Broadcasting Network (SBN), on DirecTV channel 344, Dish Network channel 257, Glorystar channel 125, AT&T U-verse, Verizon Fios, and various cable TV providers and broadcast stations.

SBN is available in the U.S. through Free To Air (FTA) satellite television. It is also available in Australia and New Zealand.

SBN is also available 24 hours a day in the United Kingdom on SKY (Channel 593), Freesat (Channel 695) and Freeview (Channel 239). It is also shown on DSTV channel 345 for African viewers.

Jimmy Swaggart Bible College
In autumn 1984, Swaggart opened Jimmy Swaggart Bible College (JSBC). The college originally provided education and communication degrees. It flourished during the 1980s.

In 1986, Ray Trask was appointed as president of JSBC.

In the fall of 1987 enrollment peaked at 1,450 students.

JSBC enrollment dropped drastically in 1988 when students left as a result of Swaggart's scandal followed by accreditation issues. In 1988 the enrollment at the Bible college was projected to drop 72% that year but the school was planning to proceed with plans to open a theological seminary. Enrollment in August 1988 was projected to be about 400 students, compared to 1,451 students last year in 1987. The estimate was based on the number of students who had registered and the inquiries from potential students.

In 1988, Ray Trask, left his position as president of JSBC. That July the college dormitories were re-branded and listed as apartments.

In 1991, JSBC was renamed the World Evangelism Bible College and enrollment dropped to 370 students. The college shut down programs in music, physical education, secretarial science, and communications that October and disbanded its basketball team. In November "the college laid off three Bible professors and an English professor, effective at the end of the fall semester."

In 1992, Bernard Rossier resigned as president of Jimmy Swaggart's World Evangelism Bible College and Seminary.

In 2019, JSBC offered Associate of Arts and Bachelor of Arts degrees, both in Biblical Studies. The College was not accredited but was seeking accreditation at that time.

In 2020, Ray Trask, former JSBC President at Jimmy Swaggart Bible College died.  Mr. Trask served as JSBC president from 1986 to 1988.

In 2021, Gabriel Swaggart, grandson of Jimmy Swaggart, was the President of JSBC. JSBC stopped offering online classes around 2020 in one of many steps to seek accreditation.  JSBC lists a total of six faculty/staff members.

In 2022, Gabriel Swaggart remains as President of JSBC. Under "accreditation" the college website states "JSBC is a corresponding institution with The Transnational Association of Christian Schools (TRACS)."  JSBC lists five college administrators, six faculty, and one staff member.

Print
Swaggart has written about 50 Christian books offered through his ministry. He is the author of the Expositor's Study Bible, 13 study guides and 38 commentaries on the Bible. The ministry also publishes a monthly magazine, The Evangelist.

Family
Since October 10, 1952, Swaggart has been married to Frances Swaggart ( Anderson, born August 9, 1937). They have one son, Donnie (born October 18, 1954), named after Jimmy Swaggart's brother who died in infancy. He has three grandchildren and 10 great-grandchildren—Abby, Caroline, Mackenzie, Samantha, Zack, Ryder, and many more.

Donnie and his son Gabriel are also preachers, making four generations of the Swaggart family to have become involved in ministerial work.

Family Christian Academy
In 1982, Swaggart founded Family Christian Academy (FCA). The school was originally run by him but is now run by Carolyn Richards, Swaggart's grandson's mother-in-law.

Popular culture

The scandals inspired the Ozzy Osbourne song "Miracle Man" on Osbourne's 1988 album No Rest for the Wicked, and a reference in the Iron Maiden song "Holy Smoke", a UK number three hit single, from the 1990 album No Prayer for the Dying. During his 1988 concerts, Bruce Hornsby would begin his song "Defenders of the Flag" from Scenes from the Southside with a tongue-in-cheek dedication to Swaggart.

Similarities were also noted between heel World Wrestling Federation character Brother Love and Swaggart's style of preaching.

The Zodiac Mindwarp song "Airline Highway" is about Swaggart's hypocrisy, featuring the lyrics "Unoriginal sin led straight to my fall", and in the chorus, "Hey Jim, the crime's in your heart / You put love in a straitjacket, it tore you apart."

Swaggart was also referred to in several recorded live performances by Frank Zappa with a medley of the Beatles' songs featuring rewritten lyrics referencing him appearing on the album Zappa '88.

Swaggart is heard throughout the 1988 Front 242 song "Welcome to Paradise".

A tearful Swaggart is seen during the music video for the Def Leppard song "Slang", appearing on-screen during the lyric "God damn".

Part of Swaggart's confessional sermon ("I beg you ... forgive me") can be heard at the start of "Kill Eye" by Crowded House. 

In 1990, "the Jimmy Swaggart show" was included as part of a list of 64 disagreeable things read by Josie Jones and released as a spoken-word track under the name "Imperfect List" by "Big Hard Excellent Fish".

In 1999, rapper Eminem vaguely made reference to hypocritical preachers, most likely referring to many in the 1980s such as Swaggart and others in his song "Criminal" in the verse where he raps "...Oh, and please send me a brand new car/and a prostitute while my wife's sick in the hospital".

"Jesus He Knows Me", a 1991 song by Genesis, is a satire on televangelists, such as Swaggart, Robert Tilton, and Jim Bakker.

In November 2021 multi-instrumentalist and songwriter Lingua Ignota released a compilation of readings called EPISTOLARY GRIEVING FOR JIMMY SWAGGART, made from letters she penned to Swaggart. This follows her sampling Swaggart's confession in her song "The Sacred Linament of Judgement" on her album Sinner Get Ready.

Canadian rock band The New Pornographers took their name from a 1986 speech by Swaggart in which he lambasted rock music as "The new pornography."

References

External links

 Jimmy Swaggart Ministries
 

1935 births
20th-century American pianists
American male pianists
American Pentecostals
American performers of Christian music
American pianists
American television evangelists
Critics of the Catholic Church
Living people
Pentecostal writers
People from Ferriday, Louisiana
Religious scandals
Religious controversies in the United States
Sex scandals in the United States
Singers from Louisiana
Southern gospel performers
Writers from Baton Rouge, Louisiana
20th-century American male singers
20th-century American singers